"Maruzzella" is the diminutive of the Neapolitan word maruzz(a) ('sea snail') and the Neapolitan diminutive of the feminine given name Marisa. It may refer to:

 "", a Neapolitan song, variously performed by Renato Carosone, Marino Marini, Mina
 Maruzzella, the original Italian name of the 1956 film Mermaid of Naples